A turn on red is a principle of law permitting vehicles at a traffic light showing a red signal to turn into the direction of traffic nearer to them (almost always after a complete stop, depending on the jurisdiction) when the way is clear, without having to wait for a green signal. North American traffic engineers first introduced this rule as a fuel savings measure, despite detrimental effects to the safety of pedestrians.

Turns

Right on red
The simplest version is commonly known as a right turn on red (or simply right on red) in countries that drive on the right side of the road, or a left turn on red in countries that drive on the left side of the road.

A right turn requires checking only two nearby crosswalks (at least one of which will show "don't walk") and vehicular traffic moving towards the driver, while a left turn or going straight requires checking two crosswalks and vehicular traffic moving in multiple directions.

When turning right on red, the vehicle typically has to yield to traffic coming from the left, and the crosswalk parallel to that stream if there is one. If turning right at a three-way junction from a major road onto a minor road, the vehicle has to yield only to the crosswalk since there is no road on the left side. Sometimes, the opposing side has a protected left turn, requiring the vehicle to yield to opposing vehicles turning left, but not any crosswalks. In any case, the vehicle turning right on red has to yield only to one stream of vehicles (out of two possible streams) and zero or one crosswalk.

Many jurisdictions that allow right turns on red will allow it to be done in any lane, including the outer lane of a dual or triple right turn.

In some intersections, allowing a right on red would be unsafe, such as when there is a train running parallel to the road on the right side, synchronized to the traffic light timings. In places where right on red is allowed by default, a sign would be placed to disallow it.

Left on red

Another version is commonly known as a left turn on red (left on red) in countries that drive on the right side of the road, and would be a right turn on red in countries that drive on the left side of the road, if any allowed it. These turns are typically restricted to turns onto a one-way. Many jurisdictions also require that this type of turn be from a one-way.

However, although right on red is equivalent to left on red to a one-way, left on red is not typically permitted in countries outside North America. Even in North America, few places allow left on red from two-way to one-way streets.

There are rarely some intersections where a left on red from a two-way to two-way is permitted, but this is due to the expected low amount of traffic, rather than being geometrically equivalent to right on red.

From one-way to one-way
Left turns from a one-way to a one-way are completely geometrically equivalent to a right turn.

Most places in North America allow this type of turn by default. Most places outside of North America disallow this type of turn.

To one-way
Left turns on red from a two-way to a one-way are the same "difficulty" as a right turn on red, although the reasoning is less obvious. If a right turn is possible, the opposing side might have a green light and protected left turn, allowing the driver to get a permissive left turn (flashing yellow arrow). If the opposing side has a red light (which is the case if a right turn is impossible), or there is no opposing side, the driver has to yield only to vehicles from the right, and possibly the nearby crosswalk. In any case, the driver has to yield to only one stream of traffic (out of two possible streams), and zero or one crosswalk.

Only British Columbia, Alaska, Idaho, Michigan, Oregon, and Washington allow this type of turn by default.

Jurisdictions

North America
Right turns on red are permitted in many regions of North America.  In the United States, western states have allowed it for more than 50 years, and eastern states amended their traffic laws to allow it in the 1970s as a claimed fuel-saving measure in response to motor fuel shortages in 1973. The Energy Policy and Conservation Act of 1975 required in §362(c)(5) that in order for a state to receive federal assistance in developing mandated conservation programs, they must permit right turns on red lights.  All 50 states, the District of Columbia, Guam, and Puerto Rico have allowed right turns on red since 1980, except where prohibited by a sign or where right turns are controlled by dedicated traffic lights. (The last state with a right-on-red ban, Massachusetts, ended its ban on January 1, 1980, but about 90% of the traffic signals in the state were outfitted with "no turn on red" signs in preparation for the change.) The few exceptions include New York City, where right turns on red are prohibited unless a sign indicates otherwise, and in Washington, DC, which will prohibit right turns on red in 2025.

In some states, such as New York, Virginia, North Carolina, Nebraska, Nevada, and California, a right turn on red is prohibited when a red arrow is displayed.

At intersections where U-turns are permitted and controlled by a U-turn arrow from the left-most lane, motorists turning right on red onto the same road must yield to those making U-turns before turning, as the motorists making U-turns have the right of way and a collision could easily occur. The exception is Pennsylvania where U-turns are allowed unless otherwise specified following the same rule as right on red, drivers making a U-turn are required to yield to all drivers executing legal maneuvers including turning right on red. At intersections where U-turns are prohibited in the same fashion, a green right turn arrow will sometimes appear for those turning right onto the road, allowing only traffic turning right to proceed without having to stop or yield to other vehicles or pedestrians. Some states such as California have "No U-Turn" signs posted at these intersections because of the green right turn arrow.

Most Caribbean countries with right-hand traffic, such as the Dominican Republic, allow right turn on red unless a sign prohibits it. Some vehicles, such as those carrying hazardous materials and school buses, are not allowed to turn on red under any circumstance and must wait for a green light or arrow.

As of 1992, right turn on red is governed federally by (c) ("Each proposed State energy conservation plan to be eligible for Federal assistance under this part shall include: ...(5) a traffic law or regulation which, to the maximum extent practicable consistent with safety, permits the operator of a motor vehicle to turn such vehicle right at a red stop light after stopping, and to turn such vehicle left from a one-way street onto a one-way street at a red light after stopping."). All turns on red are forbidden in New York City unless a sign is posted permitting it.

In Canada, a driver may turn right at a red light after coming to a complete stop unless a sign indicates otherwise. In the province of Quebec, turning right on a red was illegal until a pilot study carried out in 2003 showed that the right turn on red manoeuvre did not result in significantly more accidents. Subsequent to the study, the Province of Quebec now allows right turns on red except where prohibited by a sign. However, like in New York City, it remains illegal to turn right on a red anywhere on the Island of Montreal. Motorists are reminded of this rule by large signs posted at the entrance to all bridges.

In Mexico, right turns on red are generally allowed unless a sign indicates otherwise. Mexico City has implemented a new transit law which prohibits right turns on red.

Left turn on red 

In the U.S., 38 states allow left turns on red only if both the origin and destination streets are one way as of December, 2018.

Five states, namely Alaska, Idaho, Michigan, Oregon and Washington, allow left turns on red into a one-way street, even from a two-way.

As of December 2018, the following states and territories ban left turns on red: Connecticut, Maine, Missouri, New Hampshire, New Jersey, North Carolina, Rhode Island, South Dakota (unless permitted by local ordinance), the District of Columbia, and Guam. New York City prohibits left turn on red unless a sign indicates otherwise.

:File:Québec P-115-1.svg "No left on red" sign used in Canada (except Quebec)

In Canada, left turn on red light from a one-way road into a one-way road is permitted except in some areas of Quebec, New Brunswick, and Prince Edward Island. Left turn on red into a one-way road is permitted in British Columbia, even from a two-way road.

Some intersections have signs to indicate that a left turn on red is prohibited. In BC, Alberta, Saskatchewan, Manitoba, and Ontario, the sign for "no left turn" is defined with the line in the red circle flipped compared to other prohibitive signs. Although inconsistent, this allows "no left turn" to be a mirror image of "no right turn". However, in Quebec, the diagonal line is the same as in "no right turn".

Central America
In Costa Rica, right turns on red are allowed in general, but a sign can forbid them.

South America

In Chile and Brazil, right turns on red are only allowed when a sign permitting it is shown. In Brazil, effective April 14, 2021.

In Paraguay, right turns on red are allowed in some towns.

In Argentina, Colombia, Peru and Uruguay, right turns on red are not allowed.

Europe

In European countries in general, it is illegal to turn on a red light, unless it is indicated otherwise, for example by a green arrow on a red light, a flashing amber arrow with a red light or a permanent green board next to the red light.

In Poland, right turns on red are permitted only if an additional green arrow light (apart from the main signal light) is present and lit. However, the regulations require drivers to stop completely, as their paths intersect with other vehicles or pedestrians in at least one direction. Green arrow light can be also directed left (the same regulations apply).

In Germany, right turns on red are only permitted when a sign is present at the traffic light, after a complete stop. This rule was first introduced in 1978 in East Germany. It was derided as the "socialist right turn" in West Germany, which planned to eliminate it after German reunification in 1990. However, a public backlash put an end to the plans, and the practice spread to the rest of Germany in 1994. Half of the 5,000 turn-on-red intersections that existed in 2002 were located in the former West Germany.

In Switzerland, bicycles and small mopeds (Mofas) are allowed to turn right on certain red lights since 2021. One does not have to come to a complete stop, but must yield to crossing pedestrians and traffic. During a pilot experiment preceding this change, wide acceptance and no accident were observed.

In Slovenia, the same sign as in Germany is used, where vehicles can turn right on a red light at all times, but they don’t have the right of way. Some intersections also have a green arrow light, that is lit when right turns are allowed. Historically, a different sign with the same meaning was used in the nineteen sixties, a green curved arrow on a small white rectangle board, attached under a traffic light.

In Russia, right turns on red are only permitted if a separate arrow-shaped green light allows it; drivers must give way to any vehicle coming from a different direction. When the arrow is not lit, turns in the arrow direction are prohibited. However, in some cities, they have allowed turns on right provided there is a fixed green arrow with the writing below saying "Give way to everyone, you can turn on right".

In the Netherlands, bicycles are occasionally allowed to turn right on a red light (assuming that the design of the junction is such that the light is even applicable to right turning cyclists, which it often is not in the Netherlands). Wherever this is the case, a sign "rechtsaf voor fietsers vrij" (right turn free for cyclists) or "rechtsaf voor (brom)fietsers vrij" (right turn free for cyclists and mopeds) is present.

In France, a right turn on red without stopping is allowed when a separate arrow-shaped amber light flashes, but drivers do not have priority. They must check if any pedestrians are crossing before turning and must give way to vehicles coming from other directions. A sign can also permit cyclists to turn right on red.

In Belgium, road signs that allow cyclists to turn right on a red light have been added to traffic law in 2012. Such roads signs have been placed on intersections in the Brussels Capital Region.

Like in the Netherlands, Belgium and France have a road sign that allows cyclists to turn right on a red light. The French and Belgian signs consist of a yield sign with a yellow bike and arrow inside. Such signs are placed under traffic lights.

In the United Kingdom, which drives on the left, left turns on red are prohibited. At some junctions there is a separate left arrow-shaped green "filter" light which, when lit, allows left-hand turns but conflicting traffic will always have a red signal. Other non conflicting traffic movements may have their own left or right arrow-shaped green light. Sometimes there are specific lanes without signals for turning left, separated from the through traffic signalled traffic by traffic islands, but give way signs are installed.

In the Republic of Ireland, which drives on the left, left turns on red are prohibited, although some lights flash with a yellow arrow which is in effect the same thing - drivers may proceed if the road is clear. 

In Lithuania, drivers are allowed to turn right on red when a particular sign with a green arrow on a white background is mounted beside the red light of the traffic signal. However, on 10 November 2014, national traffic rules were altered meaning that this sign will be valid only until 31 December 2019 at the latest, by which time all such signs will have been eliminated. These changes were made for reasons of road safety. The green arrows in Lithuania were eliminated on 1 January 2020. Despite the announcement of the date for the elimination of the green arrows in October 2014, many city administrations were not prepared for alternatives, which led to considerable public outrage in January 2020. The government has allowed the return of the green arrows in response to the situation, but each green arrow must be coordinated with the Transportation Literacy Agency. The agency carries out an assessment of a green arrow with regard to traffic safety and traffic capacity.

In Latvia, you are allowed to turn right/left on red when an additional section is present and lit on a traffic light. If the main signal is red and an additional signal is lit, you may pass to the direction of the arrow in the traffic light but you must give way to all traffic (including pedestrians). If the main signal is green and an additional signal is also lit, you may pass to any direction and you must comply with the standard intersection and junction traffic rules. If the main signal is green and the additional signal is not lit, you must not turn to that direction. Logically, if the main signal is red and the additional signal is unlit - you must not pass. 

In the Czech Republic and Slovakia, right turns on red are allowed only when there is a lit green arrow present (called S 5 in Czech Republic and S 10 in Slovakia). Also in this case the car turning on red must give way to ongoing traffic, to pedestrians and other road users. (According to Czech law §70 of decree 30/2001 of Law Codex; and Slovak law §9, part 3g, decree 9/2009 of Law Codex.)

In Romania, right turns on red are only permitted if there is a small green flashing light with a right turn arrow. Drivers must yield to pedestrians and oncoming vehicles from their left. In some one-way junctions, the same rule applies for left on red (such as Cluj-Napoca Avram Iancu Square).

In Bulgaria, right turns on red are prohibited.

In Spain, right turns on red are allowed only if there is either a flashing amber or lit green arrow-shaped traffic light. Flashing amber arrow allows turning without priority (turn must be done exercising caution, giving way to any other vehicles and pedestrians that may cross the path), while a lit green arrow grants priority. If just a regular set of traffic lights is present (no light arrows), then turning on red is prohibited.

In Iceland, right turns on red are allowed only when the "Hægri Kveiktu á Rauðum" sign is displayed at the traffic junction. The driver will have to stop at the red light first and give way to pedestrians and oncoming vehicles from their left before turning.

Asia

As in the former United Kingdom British Colonies, British Hong Kong drives on the left. Left turns on red are always prohibited in Hong Kong. At some junctions, however, there may be separate sets of signals for left turns, or specific lanes for turning left separating from the through traffic by traffic islands and give way signs are installed. One such example is at the junction of Queen's Road East and Morrison Hill Road.

In China, right turns on red are generally permitted, unless there is a red arrow pointing to the right or otherwise indicated. Proceeding straight on red at T-intersections where the intersecting road went left only used to be legal in Mainland China, with right-hand traffic provided that such movement would not interfere with other traffic, but when the Road Traffic Safety Law of the People's Republic of China took effect on 1 May 2004, such movement was outlawed.

In India, which drives on the left, a "free left turn" is generally prohibited. However, some cities specifically permit turning left on a red signal. An explicit green or blinking orange left signal also permits a turn on red, which usually means that conflicting traffic is not permitted to enter the same road.

In Japan, which drives on the left, left turns on red require either a green left arrow signal along with the red light, or a white road sign with a blue left arrow (not to be confused with the one way sign).

In the Republic of Korea, right turns on red are generally permitted, but some intersections have signs indicating that right turns are only allowed when the light is green or if a green arrow is present.

In Malaysia, which drives on the left, left turn on red can only be observed in Sarawak since 1960s and Putrajaya since mid-2000s. The road sign by the traffic lights in Sarawak may state "Turn Left when Exit is Clear", as English, Malay and Chinese are used for road signage. The practice is not implemented nationwide.

In the Philippines, right turns on red are legal unless there is a sign that prohibits doing so.

As in the former United Kingdom British Colony Straits of Singapore Overseas British Territories and which drives on the left, left turns on red are always prohibited in Singapore. The driver must stop at the red light and wait for green lights to turn left only on green lights on. At most junctions, however, there may be separate sets of signals for left turns, or specific lanes for turning left separating from the through traffic by traffic islands and give way signs are installed. But, unlike other british colonies, there's a sign that permits left turns on red. The driver will have to stop at the red light first and give way to pedestrians and oncoming vehicles from their right before turning.

In Taiwan, right turns on red are always prohibited, except when there is a green arrow along with the red light.

In Thailand, which drives on the left, left turns on red are allowed unless a sign prohibits it.

In Saudi Arabia, right turns on red are generally permitted, unless there is a dedicated slip lane for right turn.

In Lebanon, unless a sign or red arrow prohibits it, right turns on red are permitted after coming to a full stop to give way to oncoming traffic and pedestrians.

Africa
In Mauritius, which drives on the left, left turns on red are prohibited like in the UK, unless there's a sign that permits it.

In South Africa, Botswana, Zimbabwe, Zambia, Mozambique, Angola, and Namibia, which drives on the left, left turns on red are prohibited like in the UK.

Oceania

In Australia, which drives on the left, left turns on red are only permitted if a sign exists at the intersection. At such intersections, the sign generally reads "left turn on red permitted after stopping," meaning a vehicle can make a left turn only after coming to a complete stop first and giving way to approaching traffic and any crossing pedestrians or cyclists. Such signs are only in limited locations in the states of New South Wales, Queensland, South Australia (six locations as of 2016) as well as the Northern Territory and Australian Capital Territory and are banned in other states. In New South Wales, a number of tests to the intersection must be met before a turn on red will be permitted, including pedestrian volume, bus stop locations, geometry of the intersection, and the amount of lane changing at the intersection. There are conflicting views on the policy of left turns on red, with supporters pointing to lower vehicle emission and time savings, while opponents cite safety concerns.

In New Zealand, which drives on the left, left turns on red are not permitted except if a green arrow is present and lit. If a "slip lane" is present at the intersection (a lane turning left separated from the other lanes by a traffic island), left turns are permitted at any time, though traffic turning left must give way to pedestrians and oncoming traffic. Slip lanes are marked with Give Way signs and are most common at busy intersections in larger cities.

In Samoa, which drives on the left, left turns on red are permitted. Samoa used to drive on the right and basically follow the US rules of American Samoa, and this rule remained after switching to driving on the left on 7 September 2009.

Table
This table shows the legal status of turns on red in various jurisdictions, where no sign is present or traffic signal explicitly prohibits it. If it is normally allowed, a sign or red arrow might prohibit it. If it is normally disallowed, a sign or arrow might allow it, or the intersection may have a separate slip lane controlled by a yield or give way sign. However, a permissive arrow allowing a right turn (or left onto one-way) after yielding to traffic, possibly after a complete stop, is different from a protected arrow that does not require yielding.

Pedestrian and bicyclist safety
A 1981 US Department of Transportation study determined that the frequency of motor vehicle collisions with bicyclists and pedestrians when the vehicle was turning right increased significantly after the adoption of "Western RTOR". According to that study "Estimates of the magnitude of the increases ranged from 43% to 107% for pedestrian accidents and 72% to 123% for bicyclist accidents." These RTOR accidents were between 1% and 3% of all pedestrian and bicycle accidents in the locations that were studied. 

A 1984 study found that where RTOR was allowed "all right-turning crashes increase by about 23%, pedestrian crashes by about 60%, and bicyclist crashes by about 100%." A 1993 study also concluded that RTOR increased crashes for pedestrians and cyclists, by 44% and 59% respectively.

For the 1982–1992 period, a National Highway Safety Commission report estimated that total fatal crashes in the U.S. involving vehicles making a right turn on red, were between  0 and 84, and probably toward the lower end of the range. 

A February 2002 study published in the ITE Journal concluded that "Prohibiting right turn on red would require drivers to turn on green. This would most likely increase the number of collisions by right turning vehicles."

A 2009 study by The New York City Department of Transportation of injuries before and after red turn on right was allowed at specific intersections concluded that the change had not affected accident rates.

See also
Vienna Convention on Road Signs and Signals

References

External links
 The Safety Impact Of Right Turn On Red: Report To Congress, National Highway Traffic Safety Administration Traffic Tech
  Transportation Research Record 1674.
 Traffic Light Signals and Red Light Cameras: Turning on Red Light (US), by Justin JIH.

Traffic law
Traffic signals